The Arabian Peninsula, ("Arabian Peninsula" or , , "Island of the Arabs") or Arabia, is a peninsula of Western Asia, situated northeast of Africa on the Arabian Plate. At , the Arabian Peninsula is the largest peninsula in the world.

Geographically, the Arabian Peninsula includes Bahrain, Kuwait, Oman, Qatar, Saudi Arabia, the United Arab Emirates (UAE), Yemen, and Palestine, as well as southern Iraq and Jordan. The largest of these is Saudi Arabia. In the classical era, the southern portions of modern-day Syria, Jordan, and the Sinai Peninsula were also considered parts of Arabia.

The Arabian Peninsula formed as a result of the rifting of the Red Sea between 56 and 23 million years ago, and is bordered by the Red Sea to the west and southwest, the Persian Gulf and the Gulf of Oman to the northeast, the Levant and Mesopotamia to the north and the Arabian Sea and the Indian Ocean to the southeast. The peninsula plays a critical geopolitical role in the Arab world and globally due to its vast reserves of oil and natural gas.

Before the modern era, the region was divided into primarily four distinct regions: the Central Plateau (Najd and Al-Yamama), South Arabia (Yemen, Hadhramaut and Oman), Al-Bahrain (Eastern Arabia or Al-Hassa), and the Hejaz (Tihamah for the western coast), as described by Ibn al-Faqih.

Etymology

During the Hellenistic period, the area was known as Arabia or Aravia. The Romans named three regions with the prefix "Arabia", encompassing a larger area than the current term "Arabian Peninsula":
 Arabia Petraea ("Stony Arabia"): for the area that is today southern modern Syria, Palestine, Jordan, the Sinai Peninsula and northwestern Saudi Arabia. It was the only one that became a province, with Petra as its capital.
 Arabia Deserta ("Desert Arabia"): signified the desert interior of the Arabian peninsula. As a name for the region, it remained popular into the 19th and 20th centuries, and was used in Charles M. Doughty's Travels in Arabia Deserta (1888).
 Arabia Felix ("Fortunate Arabia"): was used by geographers to describe what is now Yemen, which enjoys more rainfall, is much greener than the rest of the peninsula and has long enjoyed much more productive fields.

The Arab inhabitants used a north–south division of Arabia: Al Sham-Al Yaman, or Arabia Deserta-Arabia Felix. Arabia Felix had originally been used for the whole peninsula, and at other times only for the southern region. Because its use became limited to the south, the whole peninsula was simply called Arabia. Arabia Deserta was the entire desert region extending north from Arabia Felix to Palmyra and the Euphrates, including all the area between Pelusium on the Nile and Babylon. This area was also called Arabia and not sharply distinguished from the peninsula.

The Arabs and the Ottoman Empire considered the west of the Arabian Peninsula region where the Arabs lived 'the land of the Arabs' – Bilad al-'Arab (Arabia), and its major divisions were the bilad al-Sham (Levant), bilad al-Yaman (Yemen), and Bilad al-'Iraq (Iraq). The Ottomans used the term Arabistan in a broad sense for the region starting from Cilicia, where the Euphrates river makes its descent into Syria, through Palestine, and on through the remainder of the Sinai and Arabian peninsulas.

The provinces of Arabia were: Al Tih, the Sinai peninsula, Hedjaz, Asir, Yemen, Hadramaut, Mahra and Shilu, Oman, Hasa, Bahrain, Dahna, Nufud, the Hammad, which included the deserts of Syria, Mesopotamia and Babylonia.

Geography
The Arabian Peninsula is located in the continent of Asia and is bounded by (clockwise) the Persian Gulf on the northeast, the Strait of Hormuz and the Gulf of Oman on the east, the Arabian Sea on the southeast, the Gulf of Aden, Guardafui Channel and Somali Sea on the south, the Bab-el-Mandeb strait on the southwest and the Red Sea, which is located on the southwest and west. The northern portion of the peninsula merges with the Syrian Desert with no clear borderline, although the northern boundary of the peninsula is generally considered to be the northern borders of Saudi Arabia and Kuwait, also southern regions of Iraq and Jordan.

The most prominent feature of the peninsula is desert, but in the southwest, there are mountain ranges, which receive greater rainfall than the rest of the peninsula. Harrat ash Shaam is a large volcanic field that extends from northwestern Arabia into Jordan and southern Syria.

Political boundaries

The Peninsula's constituent countries are (clockwise from north to south) Kuwait, Qatar, and the United Arab Emirates (UAE) on the east, Oman on the southeast, Yemen on the south, and Saudi Arabia at the center. The island country of Bahrain lies just off the east coast of the Peninsula. Due to Yemen's jurisdiction over the Socotra Archipelago, the Peninsula's geopolitical outline faces the Guardafui Channel and the Somali Sea to the south.

The six countries of Bahrain, Kuwait, Oman, Qatar, Saudi Arabia, and the UAE form the Gulf Cooperation Council (GCC).

The Kingdom of Saudi Arabia covers the greater part of the Peninsula. The majority of the population of the Peninsula lives in Saudi Arabia and Yemen. The Peninsula contains the world's largest reserves of oil. Saudi Arabia and the UAE are economically the wealthiest in the region. Qatar, the only peninsular country in the Persian Gulf on the larger peninsula, is home to the Arabic-language television station Al Jazeera and its English-language subsidiary Al Jazeera English. Kuwait, on the border with Iraq, is an important country strategically, forming one of the main staging grounds for coalition forces mounting the United States–led 2003 invasion of Iraq.

Population

Though historically lightly populated, political Arabia is noted for a high population growth rate – as the result of both very strong inflows of migrant labor as well as sustained high birth rates. The population tends to be relatively young and heavily skewed gender ratio dominated by males. In many states, the number of South Asians exceeds that of the local citizenry. The four smallest states (by area), which have their entire coastlines on the Persian Gulf, exhibit the world's most extreme population growth, roughly tripling every 20 years. In 2014, the estimated population of the Arabian Peninsula was 77,983,936 (including expatriates). The Arabian Peninsula is known for having one of the most uneven adult sex ratios in the world, with females in some regions (especially the east) constituting only a quarter of people aged between 20 and 40.

Cities
The eleven most populous cities on the Arabian Peninsula are:

Landscape

Geologically, this region is perhaps more appropriately called the Arabian subcontinent because it lies on a tectonic plate of its own, the Arabian Plate, which has been moving incrementally away from the rest of Africa (forming the Red Sea) and north, toward Asia, into the Eurasian Plate (forming the Zagros Mountains). The rocks exposed vary systematically across Arabia, with the oldest rocks exposed in the Arabian-Nubian Shield near the Red Sea, overlain by earlier sediments that become younger towards the Persian Gulf. Perhaps the best-preserved ophiolite on Earth, the Semail Ophiolite, lies exposed in the mountains of the UAE and northern Oman.

The peninsula consists of:

 A central plateau, the Najd, with fertile valleys and pastures used for the grazing of sheep and other livestock
 Stretches of dry or marshy coastland with coral reefs on the Red Sea side (Tihamah)
 Oases and marshy coast-land in Eastern Arabia, the most important of which are those of Al Ain (Tawam in the United Arab Emirates and Oman) and Al-Hasa (in Saudi Arabia), according to one author
 Tropical monsoon coastline in Dhofar and Al-Mahra (known as Khareef in the Arabian Peninsula).

Arabia has few lakes or permanent rivers. Most areas are drained by ephemeral watercourses called wadis, which are dry except during the rainy season. Plentiful ancient aquifers exist beneath much of the peninsula, however, and where this water surfaces, oases form (e.g. Al-Hasa and Qatif, two of the world's largest oases) and permit agriculture, especially palm trees, which allowed the peninsula to produce more dates than any other region in the world. In general, the climate is extremely hot and arid, although there are exceptions. Higher elevations are made temperate by their altitude, and the Arabian Sea coastline can receive surprisingly cool, humid breezes in summer due to cold upwelling offshore. The peninsula has no thick forests. Desert-adapted wildlife is present throughout the region.

According to NASA's Gravity Recovery and Climate Experiment (GRACE) satellite data (2003–2013) analysed in a University of California, Irvine (UCI)-led study published in Water Resources Research on 16 June 2015, the most over-stressed aquifer system in the world is the Arabian Aquifer System, upon which more than 60 million people depend for water. Twenty-one of the thirty seven largest aquifers "have exceeded sustainability tipping points and are being depleted" and thirteen of them are "considered significantly distressed".

The plateau slopes eastwards from the massive, rifted escarpment along the coast of the Red Sea, to the shallow waters of the Persian Gulf. The interior is characterised by cuestas and valleys, drained by a system of wadis. A crescent of sand and gravel deserts lies to the east.

Mountains

There are mountains at the eastern, southern and northwestern borders of the peninsula. Broadly, the ranges can be grouped as follows:
 Northeast: The Hajar range, shared by the UAE and northern Oman
 Southeast: The Dhofar Mountains of southern Oman, contiguous with the eastern Yemeni Hadhramaut
 West: Bordering the eastern coast of the Red Sea are the Sarawat, which can be seen to include the Haraz Mountains of eastern Yemen, and the 'Asir and Hijaz Mountains of western Saudi Arabia, the latter including the Midian in northwestern Saudi Arabia
 Northwest: Aside from the Sarawat, the northern portion of Saudi Arabia hosts the Shammar Mountains, which include the Aja and Salma subranges
 Central: The Najd hosts the Tuwaiq Escarpment or Tuwair range

From the Hejaz southwards, the mountains show a steady increase in altitude westward as they get nearer to Yemen, and the highest peaks and ranges are all located in Yemen. By comparison, the Tuwayr, Shammar and Dhofar generally do not exceed  in height.

Not all mountains in the peninsula are visibly within ranges.

Land and sea

Most of the Arabian Peninsula is unsuited to agriculture, making irrigation and land reclamation projects essential. The narrow coastal plain and isolated oases, amounting to less than 1% of the land area, are used to cultivate grains, coffee and tropical fruits. Goat, sheep, and camel husbandry is widespread elsewhere throughout the rest of the Peninsula. Some areas have a summer humid tropical monsoon climate, in particular the Dhofar and Al Mahrah areas of Oman and Yemen. These areas allow for large scale coconut plantations. Much of Yemen has a tropical monsoon rain influenced mountain climate. The plains usually have either a tropical or subtropical arid desert climate or arid steppe climate. The sea surrounding the Arabian Peninsula is generally tropical sea with a very rich tropical sea life and some of the world's largest, undestroyed and most pristine coral reefs. In addition, the organisms living in symbiosis with the Red Sea coral, the protozoa and zooxanthellae, have a unique hot weather adaptation to sudden rise (and fall) in sea water temperature. Hence, these coral reefs are not affected by coral bleaching caused by rise in temperature as elsewhere in the indopacific coral sea. The reefs are also unaffected by mass tourism and diving or other large scale human interference. However, some reefs were destroyed in the Persian Gulf, mostly caused by phosphate water pollution and resultant increase in algae growth as well as oil pollution from ships and pipeline leakage.

In the higher elevations, elaborate terraces have been constructed to facilitate grain, fruit, coffee, ginger and khat cultivation. The Arabian peninsula is known for its rich oil, i.e. petroleum production due to its geographical location.

History
Stone tools from the Middle Paleolithic age along with fossils of other animals discovered at Ti's al Ghadah, in northwestern Saudi Arabia, might imply that hominins migrated through a "Green Arabia" between 300,000 and 500,000 years ago. 200,000-year-old stone tools were discovered at Shuaib Al-Adgham in the eastern Al-Qassim Province, which would indicate that many prehistoric sites, located along a network of rivers, had once existed in the area. Acheulean tools found in Saffaqah, Riyadh Region reveal that hominins lived in the Arabian Peninsula around 188,000 years ago. Human habitation in Arabia may have occurred as early as 130,000 years ago. A fossilized Homo sapiens finger bone found at Al Wusta in the Nefud Desert dates to approximately 90,000 years ago and is the oldest human fossil discovered outside of Africa and the Levant. This indicates human migrations from Africa to Arabia occurred around this time.

Pre-Islamic Arabia

There is evidence that human habitation in the Arabian Peninsula dates back to about 106,000 to 130,000 years ago. The harsh climate historically prevented much settlement in the pre-Islamic Arabian peninsula, apart from a small number of urban trading settlements, such as Mecca and Medina, located in the Hejaz in the west of the peninsula.

Archaeology has revealed the existence of many civilizations in pre-Islamic Arabia (such as the Thamud), especially in South Arabia. South Arabian civilizations include the Sheba, the Himyarite Kingdom, the Kingdom of Awsan, the Kingdom of Ma'īn and the Sabaean Kingdom. From 106 AD to 630 AD northwestern Arabia was under the control of the Roman Empire, which renamed it Arabia Petraea. Central Arabia was the location of the Kingdom of Kinda in the 4th, 5th and early 6th centuries. Eastern Arabia was home to the Dilmun civilization. The earliest known events in Arabian history are migrations from the peninsula into neighbouring areas.

The Arabian peninsula has long been accepted as the original Urheimat of the Semitic languages by a majority of scholars.

Rise of Islam
The seventh century saw the rise of Islam as the peninsula's dominant religion. The Islamic prophet Muhammad was born in Mecca in about 570 and first began preaching in the city in 610, but migrated to Medina in 622. From there he and his companions united the tribes of Arabia under the banner of Islam and created a single Arab Muslim religious polity in the Arabian peninsula.

Muhammad established a new unified polity in the Arabian peninsula which under the subsequent Rashidun and Umayyad Caliphates saw a century of rapid expansion of Arab power well beyond the Arabian peninsula in the form of a vast Muslim Arab Empire with an area of influence that stretched from the northwest Indian subcontinent, across Central Asia, the Middle East, North Africa, southern Italy, and the Iberian Peninsula, to the Pyrenees.

With Muhammad's death in 632, disagreement broke out over who would succeed him as leader of the Muslim community. Umar ibn al-Khattab, a prominent companion of Muhammad, nominated Abu Bakr, who was Muhammad's intimate friend and collaborator. Others added their support and Abu Bakr was made the first caliph. This choice was disputed by some of Muhammad's companions, who held that Ali ibn Abi Talib, his cousin and son-in-law, had been designated his successor. Abu Bakr's immediate task was to avenge a recent defeat by Byzantine (or Eastern Roman Empire) forces, although he first had to put down a rebellion by Arab tribes in an episode known as the Ridda wars, or "Wars of Apostasy".

Following Muhammad's death in 632, Abu Bakr became leader of the Muslims as the first Caliph. After putting down a rebellion by the Arab tribes (known as the Ridda wars, or "Wars of Apostasy"), Abu Bakr attacked the Byzantine Empire. On his death in 634, he was succeeded by Umar as caliph, followed by Uthman ibn al-Affan and Ali ibn Abi Talib. The period of these first four caliphs is known as al-khulafā' ar-rāshidūn: the Rashidun or "rightly guided" Caliphate. Under the Rashidun Caliphs, and, from 661, their Umayyad successors, the Arabs rapidly expanded the territory under Muslim control outside of Arabia. In a matter of decades Muslim armies decisively defeated the Byzantine army and destroyed the Persian Empire, conquering huge swathes of territory from the Iberian peninsula to India. The political focus of the Muslim world then shifted to the newly conquered territories.

Nevertheless, Mecca and Medina remained the spiritually most important places in the Muslim world. The Qur'an requires every able-bodied Muslim who can afford it, as one of the five pillars of Islam, to make a pilgrimage, or Hajj, to Mecca during the Islamic month of Dhu al-Hijjah at least once in his or her lifetime. The Masjid al-Haram (the Grand Mosque) in Mecca is the location of the Kaaba, Islam's holiest site, and the Masjid al-Nabawi (the Prophet's Mosque) in Medina is the location of Muhammad’s grave; as a result, from the 7th century, Mecca and Medina became the pilgrimage destinations for large numbers of Muslims from across the Islamic world.

Middle Ages

Despite its spiritual importance, in political terms Arabia soon became a peripheral region of the Islamic world, in which the most important medieval Islamic states were based at various times in such far away cities as Damascus, Baghdad, and Cairo.
However, from the 10th century (and, in fact, until the 20th century) the Hashemite Sharifs of Mecca maintained a state in the most developed part of the region, the Hejaz. Their domain originally comprised only the holy cities of Mecca and Medina but in the 13th century it was extended to include the rest of the Hejaz. Although, the Sharifs exercised at most times independent authority in the Hejaz, they were usually subject to the suzerainty of one of the major Islamic empires of the time. In the Middle Ages, these included the Abbasids of Baghdad, and the Fatimids, Ayyubids, and Mamluks of Egypt.

Modern history
The provincial Ottoman Army for Arabia (Arabistan Ordusu) was headquartered in Syria, which included Palestine, the Transjordan region in addition to Lebanon (Mount Lebanon was, however, a semi-autonomous mutasarrifate). It was put in charge of Syria, Cilicia, Iraq, and the remainder of the Arabian Peninsula. The Ottomans never had any control over central Arabia, also known as the Najd region.

The emergence of what was to become the Saudi royal family, known as the Al Saud, began in Najd in central Arabia in 1744, when Muhammad bin Saud, founder of the dynasty, joined forces with the religious leader Muhammad ibn Abd al-Wahhab, founder of the Wahhabi movement, a strict puritanical form of Sunni Islam. The Emirate of Diriyah established in the area around Riyadh rapidly expanded and briefly controlled most of the present-day territory of Saudi Arabia, sacking Karbala in 1802, and capturing Mecca in 1803. 

The Damascus Protocol of 1914 provides an illustration of the regional relationships. Arabs living in one of the existing districts of the Arabian peninsula, the Emirate of Hejaz, asked for a British guarantee of independence. Their proposal included all Arab lands south of a line roughly corresponding to the northern frontiers of present-day Syria and Iraq. They envisioned a new Arab state, or confederation of states, adjoining the southern Arabian Peninsula. It would have comprised Cilicia – İskenderun and Mersin, Iraq with Kuwait, Syria, Mount Lebanon Mutasarrifate, Jordan, and Palestine.

In the modern era, the term bilad al-Yaman came to refer specifically to the southwestern parts of the peninsula. Arab geographers started to refer to the whole peninsula as 'jazirat al-Arab', or the peninsula of the Arabs.

Late Ottoman rule and the Hejaz Railway
The railway was started in 1900 at the behest of the Ottoman Sultan Abdul Hamid II and was built largely by the Turks, with German advice and support. A public subscription was opened throughout the Islamic world to fund the construction. The railway was to be a waqf, an inalienable religious endowment or charitable trust.

The Arab Revolt and the foundation of Saudi Arabia

The major developments of the early 20th century were the Arab Revolt during World War I and the subsequent collapse and partitioning of the Ottoman Empire. The Arab Revolt (1916–1918) was initiated by the Sherif Hussein ibn Ali with the aim of securing independence from the ruling Ottoman Empire and creating a single unified Arab state spanning from Aleppo in Syria to Aden in Yemen. During World War I, the Sharif Hussein entered into an alliance with the United Kingdom and France against the Ottomans in June 1916.

These events were followed by the foundation of Saudi Arabia under King Abdulaziz Ibn Saud. In 1902, Ibn Saud had captured Riyadh. Continuing his conquests, Abdulaziz subdued Al-Hasa, Jabal Shammar, Hejaz between 1913 and 1926 founded the modern state of Saudi Arabia. The Saudis absorbed the Emirate of Asir, with their expansion only ending in 1934 after a war with Yemen. Two Saudi states were formed and controlled much of Arabia before Ibn Saud was even born. Ibn Saud, however, established the third Saudi state.

Oil reserves
The second major development has been the discovery of vast reserves of oil in the 1930s. Its production brought great wealth to all countries of the region, with the exception of Yemen.

North Yemen Civil War

The North Yemen Civil War was fought in North Yemen between royalists of the Mutawakkilite Kingdom of Yemen and factions of the Yemen Arab Republic from 1962 to 1970. The war began with a coup d'état carried out by the republican leader, Abdullah as-Sallal, which dethroned the newly crowned Muhammad al-Badr and declared Yemen a republic under his presidency. The Imam escaped to the Saudi Arabian border and rallied popular support.

The royalist side received support from Saudi Arabia, while the republicans were supported by Egypt and the Soviet Union. Both foreign irregular and conventional forces were also involved. The Egyptian President, Gamal Abdel Nasser, supported the republicans with as many as 70,000 troops. Despite several military moves and peace conferences, the war sank into a stalemate. Egypt's commitment to the war is considered to have been detrimental to its performance in the Six-Day War of June 1967, after which Nasser found it increasingly difficult to maintain his army's involvement and began to pull his forces out of Yemen.

By 1970, King Faisal of Saudi Arabia recognized the republic and a truce was signed. Egyptian military historians refer to the war in Yemen as their Vietnam.

Gulf War

In 1990, Iraq invaded Kuwait. The invasion of Kuwait by Iraqi forces led to the 1990–91 Gulf War. Egypt, Qatar, Syria and Saudi Arabia joined a multinational coalition that opposed Iraq. Displays of support for Iraq by Jordan and Palestine resulted in strained relations between many of the Arab states. After the war, a so-called "Damascus Declaration" formalized an alliance for future joint Arab defensive actions between Egypt, Syria, and the GCC member states.

2014 Yemen civil war

The Arab Spring reached Yemen in January 2011. People of Yemen took to the street demonstrating against three decades of rule by President Ali Abdullah Saleh. The demonstration led to cracks in the ruling General People's Congress (GPC) and Saleh's Sanhani clan. Saleh used tactics of concession and violence to save his presidency. After numerous attempts, Saleh accepted the Gulf Cooperation Council's mediation. He eventually handed power to Vice President Hadi, who was sworn in as President of Yemen on 25 February 2012. Hadi launched a national dialogue to address new constitutional, political and social issues. The Houthi movement, dissatisfied with the outcomes of the national dialogue, launched an offensive and stormed the Yemeni capital Sanaa on 21 September 2014. In response, Saudi Arabia launched a military intervention in Yemen in March 2015. The civil war and subsequent military intervention and blockade caused a famine in Yemen.

Gallery

See also

 Achaemenid Arabia
 Ancient history of Yemen
 Arabian Gulf Cup
 Arab League
 Arab world
 Eastern Arabia
 European exploration of Arabia
 Gulf Cooperation Council
 Iram of the Pillars
 Kingdom of Aksum
 List of Arabian cities by population
 Mashriq
 Musandam Peninsula

Explanatory notes

References

Further reading
 Travels in Arabia, 1892
 High resolution scan of old map of Arabia
 The Coast of Arabia the Red Sea, and Persian Sea of Bassora Past the Straits of Hormuz to India, Gujarat and Cape Comorin from the World Digital Library, depicts a map from 1707.
 
 Arabia: Cultural-Historical Zones
 Old maps of Arabia, Eran Laor Cartographic Collection, The National Library of Israel

External links 

 
Articles containing video clips
Geography of the Middle East
Geography of Western Asia
Historical regions
Landforms of the Middle East
Peninsulas of Asia